Busan Tower is a 120-metre-high tower at Yongdusan Park, located in Jung-gu, Busan, South Korea.

Busan Tower was built in 1973. It is only used for entertainment purposes and doesn't have any transmitting equipment. The deck features panoramic view and a small cafe, only accessible during working hours via two high-speed elevators. The base of the tower is interconnected with a few galleries and souvenir shops. The tower is usually mentioned in tourist guides as a good place to get a view of the city's port.

References 

Towers completed in 1973
Tourist attractions in Busan
Towers in South Korea
Skyscrapers in Busan
1973 establishments in South Korea
CJ Group
20th-century architecture in South Korea